List of Guggenheim Fellowships awarded in 2011: Guggenheim Fellowships have been awarded annually since 1925, by the John Simon Guggenheim Memorial Foundation to those "who have demonstrated exceptional capacity for productive scholarship or exceptional creative ability in the arts."

References

2011
2011 awards
2011 art awards